NetManage Inc. was a software company based in Cupertino, California, founded in 1990 by Zvi Alon, an Israeli engineer. The company's development centre was located at the MATAM technology park, in Haifa, Israel.  In June 2008 the company was acquired by Micro Focus International, a British company based in Newbury, Berkshire.

History
NetManage was founded in 1990 by Zvi Alon, an Israeli engineer who was trained at the Technion-Israel Institute of Technology and immigrated to the Silicon Valley in the 1980s. It was one of the first software companies to offer TCP/IP, networking, and email products.
  
During the dotcom boom, the company generated annual revenue in excess of $100m (for the year ended 31 December 2000), but in following years failed to sustain this level of income. The company was reported to have 10,000 customers worldwide, including a majority of the Fortune 500 companies. The company's shares were traded on NASDAQ under the symbol NETM.

The company's main product initially was a TCP/IP stack.  Before Windows 95, it was just about the only way to have internet on a Windows machine, as Windows 3.1 did not have TCP/IP included.  Microsoft included TCP/IP in Windows 95, which effectively made NetManage's primary business product irrelevant.

NetManage developed an entire suite of internet-based products, including a Web browser-like product called Chameleon as early as 1994. A Chameleon was also used as the company's logo.  These products sustained NetManage for a time even after the TCP/IP stack became obsolete.

Helder Antunes served as NetManage's Director of Engineering from 1993 to 1998.

The company was also involved in launching one of the first Internet service provider in Israel  - NetVision.

Products developed or acquired by NetManage
 OnWeb - Legacy Modernization, Integration & Webification software, which enables companies to improve the use of existing hardware for important applications. OnWeb turns command line applications into graphical, Web-based applications and transforms processes locked in previous software into components that can be reused. This is accomplished without changing the logic of the existing application, lowering the risk and cost of deploying new processes.
 RUMBA - Terminal emulation & Host Connectivity product. RUMBA provides users a Windows environment in which to access and use information from a broad range of host systems including IBM mainframes, IBM iSeries (AS/400), Hewlett-Packard, UNIX, and VAX computers. It provides all the core functionality of a Windows-based emulator, from multi-session support and printer emulation to a variety of file transfer and local graphics options.
 Librados - a Java JCA Application Integration Adapter
 SOA Planner - Intelligent Service Modeling & Planning solution
 Ecco Pro  - a personal information management software program
 Relay Gold - a terminal emulator software program
 Z-Mail, a cross-platform standards-based email client which was bought from Network Computing Devices
 Chameleon UNIX Link - A Web browser running on Unix

Acquisitions
 ServiceSoft Ltd - acquired in 1994
 Arabesque Software - acquired in 1994
 Syzygy Communications - acquired in 1995
 AGE Logic - acquired in 1995
 MaxInfo - acquired in 1996
 NetSoft - acquired in 1997
 FTP Software - acquired in 1998
 Relay Technology - acquired in 1999
 Wall Data, Inc, developer of RUMBA - acquired in 1999
 Simware, developer of OnWeb - acquired in 1999
 Librados - acquired in 2004

References

Companies based in Haifa
Companies formerly listed on the Nasdaq
Micro Focus International
Software companies based in California
Software companies of Israel
Software companies established in 1990
2008 mergers and acquisitions
Defunct software companies of the United States